Schistophleps noloides is a moth in the subfamily Arctiinae. It was described by Rothschild in 1913. It is found in New Guinea.

References

External links
Natural History Museum Lepidoptera generic names catalog

Moths described in 1913
Nudariina